Poe's law is an adage of internet culture saying that, without a clear indicator of the author's intent, any parodious or sarcastic expression of extreme views can be mistaken by some readers for a sincere expression of those views.

Origin
Poe's law is based on a comment written by Nathan Poe in 2005 on christianforums.com, an Internet forum on Christianity. The message was posted during a debate on creationism, where a previous poster had remarked to another user: "Good thing you included the winky. Otherwise people might think you are serious". 

The reply by Nathan Poe read:

The original statement of Poe's law referred specifically to creationism, but it has since been generalized to apply to any kind of fundamentalism or extremism.   

Its original conceptualization held that online parodies or sarcasm on religious views are indistinguishable from sincere expressions of religious views. In part, Poe was simply reiterating common advice about the need to clearly mark online sarcasm or parody (e.g. with a smiling or winking emoticon) and that without these unmistakable cues, it would be interpreted as the real thing or used by online trolls, extremists, and/or fundamentalists as sincere expressions of their authors, particularly if they match their own views. As early as 1983, Jerry Schwarz, in a post on Usenet, wrote:

In 2017, Wired published an article calling it "2017's Most Important Internet Phenomenon", and wrote that "Poe's Law applies to more and more internet interactions." The article gave examples of cases such as 4chan with the usage of the OK gesture as a white power symbol and the Trump administration where there were deliberate ambiguities over whether something was serious or intended as a parody, where people were using Poe's law as "a refuge" to camouflage beliefs that would otherwise be considered unacceptable. Some treat Poe's law as part of contemporary kitsch culture; another view maintains that Poe's law could lead to nihilism, a situation where nothing matters and everything is a joke.

See also
 Godwin's law
 Irony punctuation
 List of eponymous laws
 Post-irony
 Tone indicator
 Troll

References

External links

 How to Tell a Joke on the Internet, The Atlantic

2005 neologisms
Adages
Eponyms
Internet terminology
Political satire